Wainfelin is a suburb of Pontypool in the county borough of Torfaen, in south-east Wales.

Demographics
At the United Kingdom Census 2001 demographics showed:
Population 2,422 (Torfaen 90,949)
49.2% Male, 50.8% Female
Ages
21.4% aged between 0-15
40.7% aged between 16-44
21.4% aged 45–59/64
16.5% of pensionable age

References

Suburbs of Pontypool
Electoral wards of Torfaen